Cameron Alexander Ayers (born September 18, 1991) is an American professional basketball player, who last played for Trefl Sopot of PLK. He played college basketball for Bucknell.

College career
In his four-year career at Bucknell, Ayers played 133 games (99 starts) and averaged 11.5 points, 3.2 rebounds and 1.7 assists in 30.0 minutes per game. As a senior in 2013–14, he was named the Patriot League Player of the Year.

Professional career
After going undrafted on the 2014 NBA draft, Ayers joined the New Orleans Pelicans for the 2014 NBA Summer League. On September 1, 2014, he signed with Enel Brindisi of Italy for a tryout period. He parted ways with the club a month after signing with them.

On January 21, 2015, Ayers was acquired by the Reno Bighorns of the NBA Development League. On October 19, he signed with Šiauliai.

On October 31, 2016, Ayers was re-acquired by the Reno Bighorns, but was waived on November 30. In seven games he averaged 3.3 points in 15.9 minutes. On January 9, 2017, he was acquired by the Maine Red Claws and three days later, he made his debut for the Red Claws in a 110–94 loss to Raptors 905, recording three points, six rebounds and one steal in 19 minutes off the bench.

For the 2017–18 season, Ayers signed with Turów Zgorzelec of the Polish Basketball League. Ayers averaged 17.2 points per game while shooting 44% from the three-point arc. He inked with Italian club Pallacanestro Trapani on July 11, 2018.

On July 23, 2019, he signed with Trefl Sopot of PLK.

Personal life
Ayers is the son of Randy and Carol Ayers. His father played basketball at Miami (Ohio) and is the former head coach of the Philadelphia 76ers and Ohio State. His brother, Ryan, played basketball at Notre Dame and was team captain as a senior in 2008–09.

References

External links
Bucknell Bison bio

1991 births
Living people
American expatriate basketball people in Italy
American expatriate basketball people in Lithuania
American expatriate basketball people in Poland
American men's basketball players
Basketball players from Columbus, Ohio
Basketball players from Pennsylvania
BC Šiauliai players
Bucknell Bison men's basketball players
Germantown Academy alumni
Maine Red Claws players
Pallacanestro Trapani players
Point guards
Reno Bighorns players
Shooting guards
Sportspeople from Montgomery County, Pennsylvania
Trefl Sopot players
Turów Zgorzelec players